The 1988 Porsche Tennis Grand Prix was a women's tennis tournament played on indoor hard courts at the Filderstadt Tennis Centre in Filderstadt in West Germany and was part of the Category 4 tier of the 1988 WTA Tour. It was the 11th edition of the tournament and was held from 10 October to 16 October 1988. First-seeded Martina Navratilova won the singles title, her third consecutive and fifth in total.

Finals

Singles

 Martina Navratilova defeated  Chris Evert 6–2, 6–3
 It was Navratilova's 7th singles title of the year and the 136th of her career.

Doubles

 Iwona Kuczyńska /  Martina Navratilova defeated  Raffaella Reggi /  Elna Reinach 6–1, 6–4
 It was Kuczynska's only title of the year and the 1st of her career. It was Navratilova's 6th doubles title of the year and the 141st of her career.

Prize money

See also
 Evert–Navratilova rivalry

References

External links
 Official website 
 Official website 
 ITF tournament edition details

Porsche Tennis Grand Prix
Porsche Tennis Grand Prix
Porsche Tennis Grand Prix
1980s in Baden-Württemberg
Porsche Tennis Grand Prix
Porsch